The 1992–93 Courage National 4 South was the sixth full season of rugby union within the fourth tier of the English league system, currently known as National League 2 South.  By the end of the campaign Sudbury were crowned league champions, 2 points clear of runners-up London Welsh.  Impending changes to the league structure by the RFU meant that several new leagues were to be introduced.  This meant that champions Sudbury were promoted into the 1993–94 Division 4 while everyone else fell to Courage League Division 5 South.

Structure
Each team played one match against each of the other teams, playing a total of twelve matches each. Changes to the league structure by the RFU for the 1993-94 season meant that the champions are promoted to Courage League Division 4 while the other twelve sides went into Courage League Division 5 South.

Participating teams and locations

League table

Sponsorship
National League 4 South is part of the Courage Clubs Championship and is sponsored by Courage Brewery.

Notes

References

N4
National League 2 South